CE Digital is an operator of digital radio in the United Kingdom. It is the licensee for local DAB ensembles in London, Birmingham, and Manchester, and is a joint venture between Bauer Radio and Global Radio. It was originally a joint venture between Capital Radio and Emap Radio.

Licences

References

External links
CE Digital official website

Radio broadcasting companies of the United Kingdom
Digital audio broadcasting multiplexes
2000 establishments in the United Kingdom
Radio stations established in 2000